Master and servant describes a hierarchical relationship between an employer and a worker.

Master and servant or masters and servants may also refer to:

Master and Servant Act, legal statutes in the United Kingdom in the 18th and 19th centuries
Master and Servant Act 1889, repeal some UK laws and regulations
Parable of the Master and Servant, morality story found in the Christian Gospels (specifically, Luke Chapter 17)
Master and Servant (1979), novel by Kenyan writer David Mulwa
"Master and Servant" (1984), a Depeche Mode song
Masters and Servants, reality television show by RDF Media
Respondeat superior, legal doctrine relating to an employer's liability for acts of his employees